Chew Cottage is an historic building in Wellington, New Zealand.

The house, originally named "Millwood", was built in 1865 for John and Ester Chew. The cottage is one of Wellington's remaining houses from the 1860s. It resembles a traditional English stone cottage adapted for timber construction.

The building, is classified as a "Category I" ("places of special or outstanding historical or cultural heritage significance or value") historic place by the New Zealand Historic Places Trust.

References

Buildings and structures in Wellington City
Heritage New Zealand Category 1 historic places in the Wellington Region
Houses in New Zealand
1860s architecture in New Zealand